Tahmina or Tahmineh (various other transcriptions like Tahmeena, Tehmina, Tahmineh, Tahmina) is a female character in the story Rostam and Sohrab, part of the 10th-century Persian epic of Shahnameh. Her name is mentioned as the wife of Rostam and as the daughter of Samanganshah, the sovereign of Samangan.

References in the Shahnameh
In the Shahnameh, Rostam and Sohrab's story begins when Rostam loses his horse, Rakhsh. Grieved and angry, Rostam reaches at Samangan, where he was greeted by the king, who offered him the assurance that Rakhsh was too well known for his hiding place not to be soon discovered.

The king of Samangan invites Rostam to stay for the night, therefore, he provides a lodging for the hero in his own palace.

That night, Tahmina comes to Rostam's bedchambers and declares her love for him. The scene is so described in the Shahnama:
 At sight of her Rostam the lion heart was cast into amazement.
 Calling down the Creator's blessing on her, said, 'What is your name? What seek you in the darkness of the night and what do you desire?
 She answered, 'I am Tahmina.
 You would say that I am rent in twain with longing.
 I am daughter of the king of Samangan and I come of the stock of lions and leopards.
 On earth I have no peer among persons of royal birth; indeed beneath the dome of heaven there rarely exists anyone like me.
 Outside the veil no one has ever beheld me, nor has anyone ever heard my voice.
 But of you I have heard from all men as a legend and have been told histories of you in plenty; that you fear no Div, lion, leopard or serpent, and how bold you are in action.
 I have craved for your shoulders and arms and breast.
 Now God has vouchsafed your presence in this City.
 If you desire me, I yield myself to you, and neither bird nor fish will set eyes on me hereafter.
 One thing is sure, that I have so devoted myself to you as to have killed wisdom in favour of love.
(Shahnama, Sohrab 8:2)

Rostam commands that a virtuous Mubad should come and crave her for him from her father. After their marriage, Rostam sleeps with Tahminah and later gives her a jewel from the band around his arm, saying:
 If a daughter is granted to you by fate, take and bind it on her tresses to secure good fortune and as a talisman to brighten the world.
 But if the stars send a son, bind it upon his arm in token of his father.
 He will attain the stature of Sam son of Nariman, and he will have the valour and spirit of noble men.
 He will bring down the eagle in swift flight out of the clouds, and the sun will not shine on him with overpowering heat. '

Upon finding his horse, Rostam leaves the city of Samangan and returns to Iran. After nine months, Tahmina bears Rostam a son, Sohrab.

In the final Iran-Turan battle, when Rostam kills Sohrab, he discovers the jewel, realizing that Sohrab is his son. Tahmina's name appears once again in the Shahnama when she receives the tidings of her son's death. She is recorded to have cried:
 To whom shall I clasp upon my bosom now?
 Who is there that will rid me of my grief?
 Whom shall I call upon to take thy place?
 To whom impart my pain and misery?
 Woe for his soul and body, eye and lustre, That dwell in dust instead of hall and garden!
 (Shahnama/ Sohrab 18:29:11)

Sources and references
 Abolqasem Ferdowsi, Dick Davis trans. (2006), Shahnameh: The Persian Book of Kings , modern English translation (abridged), current standard
 Warner, Arthur and Edmond Warner, (translators) The Shahnama of Firdausi, 9 vols. (London: Keegan Paul, 1905–1925) (complete English verse translation)
 Shirzad Aghaee, Nam-e kasan va ja'i-ha dar Shahnama-ye Ferdousi(Personalities and Places in the Shahnama of Ferdousi, Nyköping, Sweden, 1993.
 Jalal Khāleghi Motlagh, Editor, The Shahnameh, to be published in 8 volumes (ca. 500 pages each), consisting of six volumes of text and two volumes of explanatory notes. See: Center for Iranian Studies, Columbia University.

Women in Shahnameh
Persian mythology
Persian literature
Persian feminine given names